Gertruida van Veen (June 4, 1602 – June 30, 1643) was a painter from the Southern Netherlands.

She was born in Antwerp as the daughter of the painter Otto van Veen. She is best known for her portrait of her father, which is held in the Brussels Museum.
Her own portrait was engraved by Lucas Vorsterman. She married Ludovicus Malo and is buried in the St. James' Church, Antwerp.

References 

1602 births
1643 deaths
Artists from Antwerp
Belgian women painters
17th-century painters